Asura cuneigera is a moth of the family Erebidae. It is found on Borneo, Peninsular Malaysia, Sumatra and Bali.

References

cuneigera
Moths described in 1862
Moths of Asia